Faces is the second studio album by the France-based, Cameroonian singer-songwriter Irma. It was released on 2 June 2014 and has charted in France, Switzerland and Belgium.

Track listing

Charts

References

2014 albums
Irma (singer) albums